Bee Aviation Associates, Inc. (Beecraft) built three prototype aircraft, designed by William F. "Bill" Chana, at Montgomery Field in San Diego, California. None of the aircraft went into production.

History
The first aircraft built was the Wee Bee in 1948. The Wee Bee is listed in the Guinness Book of World Records as the world's lightest aircraft, weighing  when empty. It had a two-cylinder engine and tricycle landing gear. The pilot flew in a prone position lying atop the fuselage. The Honey Bee was the second plane, completed in 1952. It had a single seat in an enclosed cabin. The Queen Bee was the last and the largest of the three. It was completed in 1960 and seated four. The Queen Bee and the Honey Bee had V-tails.

Defunct
The Queen Bee and the Wee Bee were destroyed in a fire that also destroyed the San Diego Aerospace Museum on February 22, 1978. The Honey Bee escaped the fire as it was still operating out of Montgomery Field at the time, owned by Walt Mooney. In 2004 the Experimental Aircraft Association donated the Honey Bee to the San Diego Air & Space Museum  where it is currently awaiting restoration at their Gillespie Field annex. According to Aerofiles two Honey Bees have been built from advertised plans. Because of its historic significance a second Wee Bee was built and is now on display at the new San Diego Air & Space Museum.

References

External links
 Picture of the Honey Bee
 San Diego Aerospace Museum Gillespie Field Annex
 Smallest Plane in the World (with pictures or the Wee Bee)
 Beecraft listed at Aerofiles

Companies based in San Diego
Defunct aircraft manufacturers of the United States